The Bergstein is a natural monument in the borough of Neustadt an der Weinstraße in the German state of Rhineland-Palatinate. It has the number ND-7316-173.

The Bergstein is described as a rock group and lies at an elevation of ca.  at the eastern end of the Palatinate Forest and is part of the Weinbiet massif. The Bergstein lies above the Speyerbach valley and has a view of the valley and the town of Neustadt. It is accessible and is protected by railings. It is only accessible on footpaths.

Natural monuments in Rhineland-Palatinate
Rock formations of Rhineland-Palatinate
Geography of the Palatinate (region)
Neustadt an der Weinstraße